Dose Your Dreams is the fifth studio album by Canadian hardcore punk band Fucked Up. The album was released on October 5, 2018 through Merge Records.

The four-year gap between the album and their 2014 album, Glass Boys, marked the longest gap in studio albums in the band's history. This was the band's last album with guitarist Ben Cook before his departure in 2021.

Accolades
The album was shortlisted for the Juno Award for Alternative Album of the Year at the Juno Awards of 2019.

Critical reception 

Dose Your Dreams received critical acclaim upon its release. On Metacritic, a review aggregate website, contemporary music critics gave Dose Your Dreams an average score of 83 out of 100, indicating "universal acclaim" based on 23 critic scores. On review aggregator AnyDecentMusic?, the album received a score of 8.2 out of 10 based on 22 reviews.

Track listing

Personnel
Fucked Up
 Damian Abraham - lead vocals (tracks 1–10, 14, 15, 18)
 Ben Cook - lead vocals (15)
 Mike Haliechuk - guitar, production (all tracks), bass guitar (1, 2, 8), keyboards (5, 6, 11, 12, 16–18), lead vocals (8, 13), additional vocals (4, 10, 11, 15)
 Sandy Miranda - bass guitar (3–7, 9–11, 13, 16, 18), bass engineering (3–7, 9, 10, 13, 16, 18)
 Jonah Falco - guitar, drums, synthesizer programming, drum programming; piano (1, 16, 18), lead vocals (12, 17), additional vocals (2–4, 6, 9, 10, 13), vocal engineering (2–6, 9, 10, 12, 13, 17), production (2–4, 9, 12, 15–18)

Additional musicians
 Amy Gottung – additional vocals (1, 4–6, 10)
 Jen Calleja – additional vocals (2, 3)
 Jane Fair – saxophone (1, 2, 4, 9, 10)
 Yoobin Ahn – violin (1)
 John Southworth – additional vocals (4, 10)
 Ruby Mariani – additional vocals (5)
 Owen Pallett – viola, viola arrangement (7, 8, 18)
 Ayo Leilani – additional vocals (8)
 Ryan Tong – lead vocals (14)
 Jennifer Castle – lead vocals (16)
 Miya Folick – lead vocals (18)
 J Mascis – additional vocals (16)
 Jeremy Gaudet – additional vocals (16)
 Mary Margaret O'Hara – additional vocals (18)
 Lido Pimienta – additional vocals (18)

Technical
 Greg Calbi – mastering
 Shane Stoneback – mixing (1–3, 6–10, 13, 18)
 Leon Taheny – mixing (4, 11)
 Matty Tavares – mixing (5)
 Alex Gamble – mixing (12, 16, 17), engineering (all tracks)
 Orphx – mixing (14)
 Graham Walsh – mixing (15)
 Bill Skibbe – guitar engineering (11)

Visuals
 Eric Kostiuk Williams – cover art
 Kevin McCaughey – additional art, design
 Daniel Murphy – additional art, design

Charting

References

External links 
 
 Dose Your Dreams at Genius
 
 Dose Your Dreams at Merge Records

2018 albums
Fucked Up albums
Merge Records albums